The men's 4 × 200 metre freestyle relay competition of the 2014 FINA World Swimming Championships (25 m) was held on 4 December.

Records
Prior to the competition, the existing world and championship records were as follows.

Results

Heats
The heats were held at 11:54.

Final
The final was held at 20:00.

References

Men's 4 x 200 metre freestyle relay